Carole Ann Seborovski (born 1960) is an American artist.

Education
Seborovski graduated from the California College of the Arts and earned her Master of Fine Arts degree from Hunter College, where she would later work as an adjunct professor.

Collections
Her work is included in the collections of the Whitney Museum of American Art, the Metropolitan Museum of Art and the Museum of Modern Art, New York.

References

1960 births
Living people
American women artists
20th-century American Jews
California College of the Arts alumni
Hunter College alumni
21st-century American Jews
20th-century American women
21st-century American women